National Route 426 is a national highway of Japan connecting Toyooka, Hyōgo and Fukuchiyama, Kyoto in Japan, with a total length of 49.6 km (30.82 mi).

References

National highways in Japan
Roads in Hyōgo Prefecture
Roads in Kyoto Prefecture